Banarsi Thug is 1962 Hindi film directed by Lekhraj Bhakri. It stars Manoj Kumar and I. S. Johar as leads. The film has music by Iqbal Qureshi.

Cast
 Manoj Kumar - Shyam
 Vijaya Chaudhari - Koili
 I. S. Johar
 Lalita Pawar
Malika - Mala 
Radhakrishan
Brahm Bhardwaj

Soundtrack

The film had music composed by Iqbal Qureshi and its songs were written by five lyricists namely Prem Dhawan, Gulshan Bawra, Hasrat Romani, Akhtar Lucknow and Aziz Qaisi. Playback was done by Mohammad Rafi, Lata Mangeshkar and others.

References

External links
 

1962 films
1960s Hindi-language films
Indian black-and-white films
Films scored by Iqbal Qureshi
Films set in Uttar Pradesh